Malta selected their Junior Eurovision entry for 2010 through Junior Eurosong, a national final consisting of 20 songs. The winner was Nicole Azzopardi, with the song "Knock Knock!...Boom! Boom!"

Azzopardi competed for Malta at the Junior Eurovision Song Contest 2010, held on 20 November in Minsk, Belarus, finishing 13th out of 14 entries.

Before Junior Eurovision

Junior Eurosong 2010 
The final took place on 4 September 2010. Twenty entries competed and the votes of a six-member jury panel (6/7) and the results of public televoting (1/7) determined the winner.

The six members of the jury that evaluated the entries during the final consisted of:

 Fr. Karm Debattista
 Joe Gatt
 Jacqueline Delicata
 Francesca Aquilina
 Marouska Muscat
 Joseph Refalo

At Junior Eurovision

Voting

Notes

References

Junior Eurovision Song Contest
Malta
2010